Merragata is a genus of velvet water bugs in the family Hebridae. There are about seven described species in Merragata.

Species
These seven species belong to the genus Merragata:
 Merragata brunnea Drake, 1917
 Merragata hackeri Hungerford, 1934
 Merragata hebroides Buchanan-White, 1877
 Merragata pallescens Distant, 1909
 Merragata quieta Drake, 1952
 Merragata sessoris Drake & Harris, 1943
 Merragata truxali Porter, 1955

References

Further reading

 
 
 
 

Articles created by Qbugbot
Hebroidea
Gerromorpha genera